Flair Across America is a bronze statue in Atlanta, Georgia by artist Richard MacDonald finished in 1996 before the 1996 Summer Olympics. It is located near the site of the former Georgia Dome in the Georgia World Congress Center complex.

The sculpture is dedicated to the Olympic athletes and to "all those who exemplify determination and dedication in the pursuit of excellence". 

The sculpture has been variously referred to as The Flair, Flair Across America, and Flair Across America: The Gymnast in different publications over the years. Prior to its installation in Atlanta, it traveled the United States on a multi-city tour. It was a gift of MacDonald to the state and to the city. It was dedicated on July 8, 1996.

References

Statues in Atlanta
Landmarks in Atlanta
Outdoor sculptures in Georgia (U.S. state)
1996 sculptures
Bronze sculptures in Georgia (U.S. state)